Parker School is an independent, co-educational day school for students in grades K-12 located in Waimea, Hawaii County, Hawaii.  The school offers a complete K-12 college-preparatory program in separate facilities for lower, middle and upper school students.

The school is fully accredited by the National Association of Independent Schools (NAIS) and the Western Association of Schools and Colleges (WASC), Parker School was established in 1976 by community leaders and has been an important community resource for nearly four decades.

History 
Established in 1976 by several North Hawai'i community leaders, Parker School became an independent day school to serve the area's high school students. Initially, the school was opened to serve grades 9 through 12.

Middle school grades were added in 1977 and, in 2005, Parker School became a full curriculum school with the addition of kindergarten through 5th grade. They continue to grow as our community, and its needs, grows. In 2007, a new Lower School campus  opened to house the newly expanded kindergarten thru 5th grades.

Parker School emphasizes continuity of education and encourages students to attend for their entire lower and high school education. Small class sizes (fewer than 30 students per grade) let teachers cater their instruction to individuals.

Parker School is fully accredited in grades K-12 by the Western Association of Schools and Colleges (WASC) and the Hawai'i Association of Independent Schools (HAIS).
It is located at 65-1224 Lindsey Road, in Waimea (post office Kamuela).

Timeline
{| class="wikitable"
| 1976 || Parker School founded
|-
| 1977 || Middle school grades added 
|-
| 1978 || Richard Smart, owner of Parker Ranch endows school 
|-
| 1995 || Parker School purchases campus 
|-
| 2005 || Parker School begins Lower School program 
|-
| 2007 || New Lower School campus opens
|}

Sports
Parker School is part of the BIIF (Big Island Interscholastic Federation), which is the Hawaii island league, and the HHSAA (Hawaii High School Athletic Association), which hosts the Hawaii State Tournaments.
Parker competes against all high schools on the island regardless of size. Parker offers co-ed cross country and girls' volleyball in the fall, co-ed soccer, basketball, and paddling in the winter, and boy's volleyball, co-ed tennis, and co-ed golf in the spring.

Academics
Parker school has produced two Presidential Scholars, eight National Merit Semifinalists and numerous AP scholars.

Presidential Scholars
{| class="wikitable"
| 2013 || Paul Gregg
|-
| 2014 || Lysha Matsunobu
|}

National Merit Semifinalists
{| class="wikitable"
| 2008 || Erica Warkus
|-
| 2011 || Edward Hon, Mary Kamitaki, Elliott Warkus
|-
| 2012 || Kieran Najita
|-
| 2013 || Paul Gregg, Aidan Wharton
|-
| 2014 || Lysha Matsunobu
|}

The Parker Debate Team competes in the Hawaii Speech League and earned National Forensics League "100 Club" recognition in 2009.  Parker won the State Championship in 2013, tied for victory in 2015 and has qualified several students to compete in the national championship.

National Debate Tournament Qualifiers
{| class="wikitable"
| 2012 || Jesse Tarnas, Lincoln-Douglas Debate
|-
| 2012 || Tyler McCullough, Lincoln-Douglas Debate
|-

| 2013 || Paul Gregg, Lincoln-Douglas Debate
|-
| 2014 || Jaren Ashcraft and Luke Potter, Public Forum
|-
| 2014 || Carrie Hiller, Lincoln-Douglas Debate
|-
|2017
|Kirk Hubbard and Susie Krall, Policy Debate
|-
|2017
|Zoe Vann and Anna Gaglione, Policy Debate
|-
|2017
|Hunter Kalahiki, Program Oral Interpretation
|}

References

External links
Parker School Website

Private K-12 schools in Hawaii County, Hawaii
Preparatory schools in Hawaii
Educational institutions established in 1976
1976 establishments in Hawaii